In calculus, a parametric derivative is a derivative of a dependent variable with respect to another dependent variable that is taken when both variables depend on an independent third variable, usually thought of as "time" (that is, when the dependent variables are x and y and are given by parametric equations in t).

First derivative 

Let  and  be the coordinates of the points of the curve expressed as functions of a variable t:

The first derivative implied by these parametric equations is 

where the notation  denotes the derivative of x with respect to t. This can be derived using the chain rule for derivatives:

In general all of these derivatives — dy / dt, dx / dt, and dy / dx — are themselves functions of t and so can be written more explicitly as, for example,

Second derivative 

The second derivative implied by a parametric equation is given by

by making use of the quotient rule for derivatives.  The latter result is useful in the computation of curvature.

Example 

For example, consider the set of functions where:

and

Differentiating both functions with respect to t leads to

and

respectively. Substituting these into the formula for the parametric derivative, we obtain

See also

 Derivative (generalizations)

External links 

Differential calculus